The 1985 Palestine Cup of Nations for Youth was the second edition of the Palestine Cup of Nations for Youth. The tournament was held in four cities in Algeria, from 15 September to 1 October 1985.

Participating teams

First group stage
The top two teams of each group advanced to the second group stage (quarter-finals).

Group A

Group B

Group C

Group D

Second group stage

Group A

Group B

Knockout phase

Bracket

Semi-finals

Third place play-off

Final

References

Arab
Palestine Cup of Nations for Youth
Palestine Cup of Nations for Youth
Palestine Cup of Nations for Youth